Jorge Grau (born Jorge Grau Solá, 27 October 1930 – 26 December 2018) was a Spanish director, scriptwriter, playwright and painter. His 1965 film Acteón was entered into the 4th Moscow International Film Festival. In 1973, he directed Ceremonia sangrienta (a.k.a. Legend of Blood Castle and The Female Butcher), starring Ewa Aulin.  In 1974, he directed the cult zombie film The Living Dead at the Manchester Morgue (a.k.a. Let Sleeping Corpses Lie, a.k.a. Don't Open the Window.)  Grau died on 27 December 2018.

Selected filmography
 Acteón (1965)
 Ceremonia sangrienta (1973) a.k.a. Legend of Blood Castle, a.k.a. The Female Butcher
 Violent Blood Bath (1973) a.k.a. Penalty of Death
 Let Sleeping Corpses Lie (1974) a.k.a. The Living Dead at the Manchester Morgue                    
 El extranger-oh! de la calle Cruz del Sur (1987)

References

External links

1930 births
2018 deaths
Writers from Barcelona
Spanish film directors
Spanish male screenwriters
Catalan dramatists and playwrights
Spanish dramatists and playwrights
Spanish male dramatists and playwrights
20th-century Spanish painters
20th-century Spanish male artists
Spanish male painters
21st-century Spanish painters
Horror film directors
Painters from Barcelona
21st-century Spanish male artists